Moritsugu is a Japanese surname. Notable people with the name include:

 Jon Moritsugu (born 1965), American cult/underground filmmaker
 Kenneth P. Moritsugu (born 1945), American physician and public health administrator
 Kim Moritsugu, Canadian writer
 Kohji Moritsugu (born 1943), Japanese actor

Japanese-language surnames